Guy Forget and Yannick Noah were the defending champions but only Forget competed that year with Henri Leconte.

Forget and Leconte lost in the semifinals to Ken Flach and Robert Seguso.

Flach and Seguso won in the final 6–2, 7–6 against Pieter Aldrich and Danie Visser.

Seeds

Draw

Final

Top half

Bottom half

External links
1988 Stella Artois Championships Doubles Draw

Doubles